Austropotamobius is a genus of European crayfish in the family Astacidae. It contains four extant species, and one species known from fossils of Barremian age:
Austropotamobius bihariensis Pârvulescu 2019 — Idle crayfish
Austropotamobius fulcisianus (Ninni, 1886)
Austropotamobius pallipes (Lereboullet, 1858) — White-clawed crayfish
Austropotamobius torrentium (Schrank, 1803) — Stone crayfish
Austropotamobius llopisi (Via, 1971) †

References

Astacidae
Crustacean genera
Taxonomy articles created by Polbot
Extant Barremian first appearances